Cape Pillar is a rural locality in the local government area (LGA) of Tasman in the South-east LGA region of Tasmania. The 2016 census recorded a population of 4 for the state suburb of Cape Pillar.
It is on the Tasman Peninsula in the Tasman National Park, adjacent to Tasman Island.

It is notable as a coastal feature of the Dolerite landscape of the area.

It has been captured in illustrations as early as 1824 and later.

It is the location of a rare casuarina, Allocasuarina crassa.

It has been an area where whales have been sighted.

It is a reference point on the coast for mapping by Australian navy hydrographic service.

History 
Cape Pillar is a confirmed locality.

Geography

The waters of the Tasman Sea form the western, southern and eastern boundaries.

Road infrastructure
Route C344 (Fortescue Bay Road) passes to the north of the locality. From there, Three Capes Track provides access to the locality.

Notes

Tasman National Park
Localities of Tasman Council